The SS Princess Maud was a single screw passenger/cargo steamship completed in 1902 for the London and North Western Railway.

References

1902 ships
Ships built on the River Clyde
Passenger ships of the United Kingdom
Ships of the London and North Western Railway
Ships sunk by German submarines in World War I